Shane Evans may refer to:

 Shane Evans (artist), American writer and artist
 Shane Evans (businessperson), American businessperson
 Shane Evans (musician) (born 1970), American musician